Miss Earth 2018, the 18th edition of the Miss Earth pageant, with the theme "Goddesses of the Earth", was held on November 3, 2018, at the Mall of Asia Arena in Pasay, Metro Manila, Philippines. Karen Ibasco of the Philippines crowned her successor Nguyễn Phương Khánh of Vietnam at the end of the event. This is the first time Vietnam won the Miss Earth pageant, one of the Big Four international beauty pageants.
On October 20, 2018, Miss Earth announced in their Facebook page that the winners of Eco-Video and Eco-Media Award winners automatically fast-tracked to the Top 18; the two delegates who earned two spots through the preliminary panel of judges and by the votes of social media.

In August 2019, the Miss Earth 2018 winners and the Armed Forces of the Philippines conducted an outreach program for the welfare of the senior citizens and persons with disabilities admitted at the Veterans Memorial Medical Center  in the Philippines.

Results

Placements

 
(§) – Placed in the Top 18 are two spots chosen by the People and Judges for the Best Eco-Video (1) and Best Eco-Social Media (1) Awardees

Category Results

Order of announcements

Top 18

Top 12

Top 8

Top 4

Winning Answer 

The winning answer of Miss Earth 2018, Nguyễn Phương Khánh of Vietnam:

Judges 
The judges for the pageant coronation night and live telecast include:
 Wilbert Ting Tolentino - LGBTQIA+ Icon, President of Web Marketers Specialists Association of the Philippines, pageant producer of Mr. Fahrenheit, Miss F Universe, Miss Earth Fahrenheit, Fahrenheit Look Of The Year, Miss F Jumbo, Mr. Bear Fahrenheit, Miss F Supranatural, The Voice Fahrenheit & Mr. Gay World Philippines 2009 
 Jacky Fan Zhonglin - Young Entrepreneur, Philanthropist, Beauty Pageant Organizer & President of Yang Gui Group Philippines
 Daniele Ponzi - Chief of the Environment Thematic Group & Former Lead Environment Specialist of Asian Development Bank - Philippines
 Joel Apolinario
 Jerrald Napoles - actor, comedian

Background
On July 26, 2018, it was announced through Miss Earth Organization's social media accounts that the pageant will be held in the Philippines again from October 6 to November 3.

The live telecast of the pageant's coronation night will be held at the Mall of Asia Arena in Pasay for the third consecutive year.

On October 20, 2018, Miss Earth announced in their Facebook page that they will have this year's Eco-Video and Eco-Media Award winners, an automatic fast-tracks to the Top 18. Two candidates will earn two spots through the preliminary panel of judges and by the votes of social media.

Pre Pageant Activities

Medal Tally
To sort this table by delegate, total medal count, or any other column, click on the  icon next to the column title.

Medalists

Local Special Awards

Sponsor's Awards

Contestants
87 contestants competed for the title.

Notes

Debuts

Returns

Last competed in 2008:
 
Last competed in 2009:
 
 
Last competed in 2014:
 
 
Last competed in 2015:
 
 
 
 
 
Last competed in 2016:

Replacements
  – Faye Bulcke was appointed Miss Earth Belgium 2018 by Ken Stevens (national director of Miss Earth Belgium) as a replacement to Mayke Aendekerk, who cannot compete to the pageant due to personal reasons. Bulcke was crowned 2nd runner-up at the Miss Exclusive 2016 pageant. The winner of Miss Exclusive pageant usually competes at Miss Earth.
  – Karen Jenifer Quispe Nava was appointed Miss Earth Bolivia 2018 by Promociones Gloria as a replacement to Ilssen Olmos Ferrufino, who was reportedly rejected by Miss Earth Organization for not meeting the age requirements of the pageant. Quispe was crowned Virreina Miss World Bolivia 2018. Olmos will compete in Miss Supranational 2018 pageant instead.
  – Nishi Bharadwaj has been appointed as Miss Earth India 2018 by Glamanand Supermodel India Organization as a replacement to the original title holder of Miss Earth India 2018 Devika Vaid. The original winner suffered with an injury making her unable to compete at the forthcoming Miss Earth 2018.

Designations
  – Margo Fargo was appointed as Miss Earth South Africa 2018. The appointment was due to conflict of schedules with Miss Earth South Africa 2018 pageant and the Miss Earth 2018 pageant arrival. Fargo previously worked as Miss Earth South Africa Ambassador in 2014 and recently competed for Miss South Africa 2018, where she placed in the Top 12.
  – Nirada Chetsadapriyakun was appointed as Miss Earth Thailand 2018 by Pawina Bumrungrot, National Director of ERM Marketing Co., Ltd., Thailand. Nirada was the 2nd Runner-up of Miss All Nations Thailand 2017.

Withdrawals
During the contest
  – Jaime Vandenberg participated in some the preliminary activities in Manila but she decided to withdraw before the coronation night after accusing one of the Filipino food sponsors of sexual harassment during a dinner at the Manila Yacht Club.
 – Salwa Akar was dethroned the title "Miss Earth Lebanon 2018" by the Miss Lebanon Organization after her photo with Miss Israel appeared in the media. She returned to her hometown afterwards.

Before the contest

Controversies

Lebanon and Israel conflict
Miss Lebanon 2018 Salwa Akar received international press attention when she was stripped of her title in Lebanon, while participating in Miss Earth 2018 pageant after she posted a photo in Facebook with her arm around Miss Israel's Dana Zreik and making peace signs. Lebanon and Israel are in a long-standing state of war. As a result, she was unable to continue her participation in the Miss Earth pageant. In a press release, Israel's Prime Minister Benjamin Netanyahu’s spokesman Ofir Gendelman reacted on Akar’s dethronement and condemned the "Lebanese apartheid."

Sexual harassment allegations
On November 7–8, 2018, Jaime Vandenberg of Canada, Abbey-Anne Gyles-Brown of England, and Emma Sheedy of Guam accused one of the Filipino food sponsors of sexual harassment during a dinner at the Manila Yacht Club, claiming that he asked them for sexual favors in exchange for the crown or an advancement in the pageant. Sheedy had identified the sponsor as Amado S. Cruz, who is president of a car rental company and CEO of a construction company. The Manila Yacht Club officials clarified that Cruz is not a member and could have just been sponsored by another member. The pageant officials indicated that Cruz was not one of the major sponsors of the pageant and just sponsored for an evening meal.

Vandenberg withdrew from competition after Cruz obtained her mobile number without her consent and kept calling her for her hotel and room number. The pageant officials stated that they did not know how Cruz obtained her number, and they only have the delegates' international contact numbers and the pageant's mode of communication was through messenger and group chat only.

Vandenberg also claimed the organizers confiscated her passport on the first day of competition. The pageant organizers denied Vandenberg's claim, stating that delegates are free to keep their passports by signing a waiver and they only keep the passports for safekeeping since there had been many occasions of misplacing or losing their passports and to facilitate check-in for their domestic flights and hotel accommodations.

Vandenberg also said that seven candidates left the dinner and accompanied by the team managers to sit on the bus after feeling uncomfortable with the sponsor. All three candidates voiced their complaints to organizer Lorraine Schuck, but despite Schuck's assurance that Cruz would not be allowed near the candidates, he still appeared in the pageant. Schuck then stated that she does not have any authority in public places, such as the hotels where the delegates stayed and the Mall of Asia Arena where the grand final of the pageant took place since the pageant was a public event. Furthermore, Schuck said that all the delegates had police escorts for their safety. Schuck subsequently announced that Cruz is 'forever banned' from Miss Earth.

On November 9, 2018, Cruz denied the accusations of the three candidates. In addition, Monica Aguilar of Cuba claimed there were no instances of sexual harassment during the competition. Instead, she stated that the sponsor asked only if they wished to extend their visas to proceed to Boracay after the pageant, and she further stated that "no one was promised to get us further in the competition through 'sexual favors."

On November 10, 2018, Schuck's company Carousel Productions Inc. urged other candidates to come forward if they experienced any incidents of sexual harassment during the pageant. The organizer also expressed support to the delegates in case they decide to take any further action to the alleged perpetrator.

Crossovers 
Contestants who previously competed or will be competing at other international beauty pageants:

 Miss Universe
 2021: : Valeria Ayos (Top 5)
 2021: : Antonia Figueroa (Unplaced)
 2021: : Maristella Okpala (Unplaced), Best National Costume
 2022: : Celeste Cortesi (Unplaced)
 2022: : Telma Madeira (Top 16)
 2023: : Diana Silva

 Miss World
 2016: : Antonia Figueroa (Unplaced)
 2017: : Renae Martinez (Unplaced)

 Miss International
 2019: : Monique Shippen (Unplaced)

 Miss Asia Pacific International
 2018: : Sona Danielyan (Unplaced)

 Top Model of the World
 2017: : Maren Tschinkel (Unplaced)

 Reinado Internacional Del Café
 2018: : Dolores Cardoso (Unplaced)

 Miss Grand Mar Universe
 2016: : Yanika Azzopardi (Top 5)

 Miss City Tourism World
 2017: : Diana Silva (Winner)

 Miss Black San International Queen
 2017: : Xamiera Kippins (Winner)

 Miss Tourism America
 2014: : Larissa Dominguez (Winner)

Broadcasters

References

External links

2018
2018 beauty pageants
Beauty pageants in the Philippines
2018 in the Philippines